Lindsay Beach is a community located in Orleans County, Vermont. It is located north of Newport, Vermont and east of Lake Memphremagog.

References 

Geography of Orleans County, Vermont